Nygaard, Nygård or Nygard all have a Norwegian, Danish, or Swedish origin and mean "new homestead" or "new farm".  It may refer to:

People
Nygaard (surname), a list of people with surnames Nygaard, Nygård, or Nygard

Places

Canada
Nygard Park, in Deloraine, Manitoba, Canada

Norway
Nygård, Gildeskål, a village in the municipality of Gildeskål in Nordland county
Nygård, Nordland, a village in the municipality of Meløy in Nordland county
Nygård, Norway, a borough in the city of Bergen in Vestland county
Nygård Bridge, a bridge in the city of Bergen in Vestland county
Nygård Church, a church in Nygård in the city of Bergen in Vestland county
Nygård, Tromsø, a borough in the city of Tromsø in Troms og Finnmark county
Nygård, Vestfold, a borough in the city of Sandefjord in Vestfold og Telemark county

Sweden
Nygård, Sweden, a village in Lilla Edet Municipality
Nygårds hagar, a village area near Stockholm

Other uses
Aschehoug, a Norwegian publishing company that is formally called H. Aschehoug & Co. (W. Nygaard).  The W. Nygaard in the name refers to William Martin Nygaard
Nygård International, clothing design and manufacturing company